|}

The Prix La Rochette is a Group 3 flat horse race in France open to two-year-old thoroughbreds. It is run at Longchamp over a distance of 1,400 metres (about 7 furlongs), and it is scheduled to take place each year in September.

History
The event was originally part of a series called the Prix Triennal. The first leg, the precursor of the modern version, was introduced in 1882. The second, for three-year-olds, began in 1883, and the third, for four-year-olds, in 1884. Each was restricted to horses owned by the breeder who foaled them. The races were initially held at Fontainebleau, and the juvenile division was contested over 1,100 metres.

The Prix Triennal was renamed in memory of Charles de La Rochette (1820–1889), a long-serving steward of the Société d'Encouragement, in 1889. It moved to Longchamp in 1892, and the two-year-old leg was cut to 1,000 metres. It reverted to 1,100 metres in 1893.

The series switched to Chantilly in 1906, and from this point the two and three-year-old parts were split into separate divisions for colts and fillies. They were abandoned during World War I, but substitutes were held at Maisons-Laffitte in 1918. The series returned to Longchamp in 1919, and to Chantilly in 1920. It was staged at Deauville in 1922, and on this occasion the juvenile legs were run over 1,000 metres. It resumed at Chantilly in 1923, and the split-race format continued until 1929.

The Prix La Rochette was cancelled three times during World War II, in 1939, 1940 and 1944. It was transferred to Longchamp with a new distance of 1,000 metres in 1941, and temporarily switched to Le Tremblay in 1943. In the post-war years it was usually held at Longchamp, but there were short periods at Chantilly (1947, 1,100 metres), Deauville (1955) and Chantilly again (1957–1959).

The distance of the race was progressively increased during the late 1960s. There were brief spells at 1,300 metres (1966–67), 1,400 metres (1968) and 1,500 metres (1969), before a sustained period over 1,600 metres began in 1970.

The Prix La Rochette was restricted to male horses from 1995 to 1999, and it was run at Chantilly from 1997 to 2000. It returned to Longchamp with a length of 1,400 metres in 2001.

Records
Leading jockey (8 wins):
 George Stern – Farnus (1901), Val d'Or (1904), Sidia (1906), Azalee (1908), Dagor (1912), Marka (1912), Mousse de Mer (1913), Banstar (1925)

Leading trainer (10 wins):
 Robert Denman – Farnus (1901), Gouvernant (1903), Val d'Or (1904), Sidia (1906), Azalee (1908), Dagor (1912), Marka (1912), Mousse de Mer (1913), Banstar (1925), Esclarmonde (1926)
 François Boutin – Neptunium (1971), Banjer (1973), Le Marmot (1978), Un Reitre (1979), Vorias (1980), Persepolis (1981), L'Emigrant (1982), Pasakos (1987), Linamix (1989), Indian Jones (1994)

Leading owner (10 wins):
 Edmond Blanc – Marly (1892), Lucie (1899), Farnus (1901), Gouvernant (1903), Val d'Or (1904), Sidia (1906), Azalee (1908), Dagor (1912), Marka (1912), Mousse de Mer (1913)

Winners since 1979

 Rainbow Corner finished first in 1991, but he was relegated to second place following a stewards' inquiry.

 Yasoodd was first in 2005, but he was placed fourth after a stewards' inquiry.

 The 2016 & 2017 races were run at Saint-Cloud while Longchamp was closed for redevelopment.

Earlier winners

1882–1905

 1882: Satory
 1883: Yvrande
 1884: Barberine
 1885: Jupin
 1886: Arlay
 1887: Stuart
 1888: Criniere
 1889:
 1890: Clairon
 1891: Chene Royal
 1892: Marly
 1893: Dolma Baghtche
 1894: Montlhery
 1895: Brunehilde
 1896: Roxelane
 1897: Madagascar
 1898: Franco-Russe
 1899: Lucie
 1900: Eryx
 1901: Farnus
 1902: Reine Margot
 1903: Gouvernant
 1904: Val d'Or
 1905: Sly Fox

1906–1929 (colts' division)

 1906: Calomel
 1907: Schuyler
 1908: Hag to Hag
 1909: Ulm
 1910: Manfred
 1911: Petulance
 1912: Dagor
 1913: La Farina
 1914–17: no race
 1918: Observateur
 1919: Odol
 1920: Arbre Sec
 1921: Sombrero
 1922: Sao Paulo
 1923: Scaramouche
 1924: Lezignan
 1925: Banstar
 1926: Andorra
 1927: Seymour
 1928: Rosolio
 1929: Pearlash

1906–1929 (fillies' division)

 1906: Sidia
 1907: Scabieuse
 1908: Azalee
 1909: Urgulosa
 1910: Brume
 1911: Qu'elle Est Belle
 1912: Marka
 1913: Mousse de Mer
 1914–17: no race
 1918: Stearine
 1919: La Chiffa
 1920: Farthing
 1921: Hyperite
 1922: Pomare
 1923: Carnation
 1924: Canalette
 1925: Solette
 1926: Esclarmonde
 1927: Roahouga
 1928: Necklace
 1929: Swiss Miss

1930–1978

 1930: Pearl Cap
 1931: La Bourrasque
 1932: Negundo
 1933: Cingalaise
 1934: Aromate
 1935: Mistress Ford
 1936: Catherinette
 1937: Shrew
 1938: Canzoni
 1939–40: no race
 1941: Esmeralda
 1942: Caravelle / Dogat *
 1943: Le Volcan
 1944: no race
 1945: Tourmente
 1946: Djelal
 1947: Balle Negre
 1948: Musette
 1949: Janus
 1950: La Taglioni
 1951: Luzon
 1952: Cobalt
 1953: Ferriol
 1954: Tactic
 1955: Belle Epoque
 1956: Franc Luron
 1957: Nubile
 1958: Iadwiga
 1959: Hautain
 1960: Cocomel
 1961: La Sega
 1962: Wideawake
 1963: Takawalk
 1964: Shamirah
 1965: Silver Shark
 1966: Monatrea
 1967: Vent du Nord
 1968: Mia Pola
 1969:
 1970: Dictus
 1971: Neptunium
 1972: Satingo
 1973: Banjer
 1974: Dandy Lute
 1975: Monsieur Dian
 1976: Command Freddy
 1977: River Knight
 1978: Le Marmot

* The 1942 race was a dead-heat and has joint winners.

See also
 List of French flat horse races
 Recurring sporting events established in 1882 – this race is included under its original title, Prix Triennal.

References
 France Galop / Racing Post:
 france-galop.com – A Brief History: Prix La Rochette.
 galopp-sieger.de – Prix La Rochette (ex Prix Triennal).
 horseracingintfed.com – International Federation of Horseracing Authorities – Prix La Rochette (2016).

Flat horse races for two-year-olds
Longchamp Racecourse
Horse races in France